Che Pope (born May 3, 1970) is an American record executive, record producer, and songwriter from Boston, Massachusetts, also the former COO of GOOD Music and the founder of Wrkshp Media. He is perhaps best known for producing on the Grammy Award for Album of the Year winning album Miseducation of Lauryn Hill and the Grammy-nominated "Bound 2" by Kanye West, as well as executive producing Cruel Summer and co-executive producing Yeezus.

Career 

Pope entered the music industry in 1994 signed to Teddy Riley, after Riley was introduced to Pope's instrumentals via a mutual friend. In 1995, Pope relocated to New York where he began producing for Wyclef Jean and The Fugees, accruing credits on the tracks Destiny Child's “No, No, No Part 2”, “Ghetto Supastar”, “Gone Til November”, among others. While working with Jean, Pope was introduced to Lauryn Hill, who invited him to produce and write with her on several projects including Aretha Franklin's "A Rose Is Still A Rose", Carlos Santana's "Do You Like The Way", The Miseducation of Lauryn Hill, and more. Pope's production on The Miseducation of Lauryn Hill earned him his first Grammy win. Due to improper crediting and compensation, several lawsuits stemmed from the project. Pope and his then co-producer opted not involve themselves in the ongoing litigation surrounding the album, but parted ways with the production team to pursue independent efforts.

After his time with spent working with Hill, Pope continued to produce projects in both domestic and foreign markets. In 1999, he was hired as the Vice President of A&R at Warner Bros Records. Pope later moved to Los Angeles to explore film composition. Pope was hired by composer Hans Zimmer as a staff producer, contributing production to over 150 films, television shows, and commercials. Pope parted ways with Zimmer's studio in 2000. Pope was introduced to Dr. Dre through a mutual friend and subsequently offered a position on the latter's immediate production team, with whom he collaborated for over 8 years. Pope worked on Aftermath projects including projects by Eminem and 50 Cent among others. In an interview for the podcast "A Waste of Time", Pope estimated that he had produced over 1,000 unreleased tracks for Dr. Dre and the Aftermath during his tenure with the label.

In 2012, Pope joined G.O.O.D. Music as a partner, as well as head of A&R. In addition to his administrative work for the label, Pope continued to produce for the label's signed artists. In 2014 he was named Chief Operations Officer of G.O.O.D. Pope is also credited with establishing the initial collaborative relationship between West and apparel company Adidas, the distributor of the Yeezy clothing line. Recent production from Pope includes the tracks "Jukebox Joints" on ASAP Rocky's album At. Long. Last. ASAP and "Tell Your Friends" on The Weeknd's 2015 release Beauty Behind the Madness with West, Illangelo and Mike Dean.

Production credits

1990s

1997 

M People - Fresco
Destiny's Child - "No, No, No Part 2"

1998 

Lauryn Hill - The Miseducation of Lauryn Hill
Aretha Franklin - A Rose is Still a Rose
Pras - Ghetto Supastar

1999 

Santana - Supernatural
Mary J. Blige - Mary

2000's

2002 

Beverly Knight - Who I Am

2004 

Eminem - Encore
 Eminem - "Ass Like That"
 Eminem - "Just Lose It"

2005 

The Game - "Hate It or Love It"
 The Game - The Documentary
50 Cent - The Massacre

2006 

Mobb Deep - Blood Money
Busta Rhymes - The Big Bang
Jay-Z - Kingdom Come
India.Arie - Testimony: Vol. 1, Life & Relationship

2008 

RZA (as Bobby Digital) - Digi Snax

2009 

Raekwon - Only Built 4 Cuban Linx... Pt. II

2010's

2012 

 G.O.O.D. Music - Kanye West Presents: G.O.O.D. Music - Cruel Summer

2013 

Pusha T - My Name is My Name
Kanye West - Yeezus
 Kanye West - "Bound 2"

2014 

Teyana Taylor - VII

2015 

The Weeknd - Beauty Behind the Madness
 A$AP Rocky - At. Long. Last. A$AP.
Pusha T - King Push — Darkest Before Dawn: The Prelude
 Kanye West - "All Day"

2018 

Christina Aguilera - Liberation
 Teyana Taylor - K.T.S.E.
 Kanye West - Ye
Nas - Nasir

Awards

Grammy Awards

References

External links

 https://www.instagram.com/chepope/?hl=en

Living people
American hip hop record producers
African-American record producers
African-American musicians
Businesspeople from Boston
Midwest hip hop musicians
Place of birth missing (living people)
Musicians from Boston
1970 births
21st-century African-American people
20th-century African-American people